Gold is a 2010 Japanese television drama series with 11 episodes that aired from July 8 to September 16.

Cast

Main
Yūki Amami as Yūri Saotome
Masami Nagasawa as Rika Nīkura
Tori Matsuzaka as Kō Saotome
Emi Takei as Akira Saotome
Takashi Sorimachi as Jōji Hasumi

Guest
Susumu Terajima as Tatsuya Akashi
Gō Ayano as Yōsuke Utsugi
Haru as Ryōko Shiina
Nao Minamisawa as Maiko Jindai

References

External links
  
 

Japanese drama television series
2010 Japanese television series debuts
2010 Japanese television series endings
Fuji TV dramas
Television shows written by Shinji Nojima